Noel Howlett (22 December 1902 – 26 October 1984) was an English actor, principally remembered as the incompetent headmaster, Morris Cromwell, in the ITV 1970s cult television programme Please Sir! He was the subject of infatuation by Deputy Head Doris Ewell, played by Joan Sanderson.

Howlett was born in Bexley, Kent, and began his career as Richard Greatham in Noël Coward's Hay Fever. At Northampton Repertory Theatre in 1930 he played Sherlock Holmes. He also appeared as Mr Williams in the 1948 film The Winslow Boy, starring Robert Donat. At Stratford-on-Avon in 1953, he played Old Gobbo (father to Donald Pleasence's Launcelot Gobbo) in The Merchant of Venice, Edward IV (brother to Marius Goring's Richard III), Baptista in The Taming of the Shrew and Gloucester in King Lear.

An early TV role was portraying a vicar in the 1958/59 BBC series Quatermass and the Pit. He appeared as Professor Rushton in a one-off 1967 edition ("Mission Highly Improbable") of The Avengers and as the Reverend Simon Blanding in a one-off 1967 edition ("Dead Man's Shoes") of Man in a Suitcase. Other screen appearances include the 1960s TV shows Softly, Softly and Danger Man. He also appeared in one 1976 episode ("I Talk to the Trees") of the BBC situation comedy The Good Life as slightly eccentric allotment gardener Mr Wakeley.

He also frequently broadcast and did a spell for the BBC as a member of their Drama Repertory Company (now the Radio Drama Company), one of his appearances being as Inspector Walter Neider in the 1965 Paul Temple radio episode, "Paul Temple and the Geneva Mystery".

Selected filmography

 Men Are Not Gods (1936) – Cashier (uncredited)
 A Yank at Oxford (1938) – Tom Craddock
 The Proud Valley (1940) – Company Clerk (uncredited)
 George and Margaret (1940) – Malcolm
 Jassy (1947) – Court Usher (uncredited)
 The White Unicorn (1947) – Sir Humphrey Webster (uncredited)
 When the Bough Breaks (1947) – Judge
 The Mark of Cain (1947) – Judge (uncredited)
 This Was a Woman (1948) – Chief Surgeon Barclay
 Corridor of Mirrors (1948) – Psychiatrist (uncredited)
 The Calendar (1948) – Lawyer
 Good-Time Girl (1948) – Clerk
 The Winslow Boy (1948) – Mr. Williams (uncredited)
 Saraband for Dead Lovers (1948) – Count Platen
 The Blind Goddess (1948) – Court Usher
 Scott of the Antarctic (1948) – First Questioner
 Once Upon a Dream (1949) – Solicitor
 The Perfect Woman (1949) – Scientist
 Your Witness (1950) – Martin Foxglove K.C. – Sam's Barrister
 The Reluctant Widow (1950)
 Laughter in Paradise (1951) – Clerk of the Court
 Cloudburst (1951) – Johnson
 Scrooge (1951) – First Collector
 Father Brown (1954) – Auctioneer
 One Good Turn (1955) – Jeweller
 Handcuffs, London (1955) – Jeremiah Rugeley
 Lust for Life (1956) – Commissioner Van Den Berghe
 Nowhere to Go (1958) – Uncle Tom Howard (uncredited)
 Serious Charge (1959) – Mr. Peters
 The Scapegoat (1959) – Dr. Aloin
 The Battle of the Sexes (1960) – Mr. White
 Mary Had a Little... (1961) – Pottle
 Victim (1961) – Patterson
 Lawrence of Arabia (1962) – Vicar at St. Paul's (uncredited)
 Tomorrow at Ten (1962) – Brain Specialist
 Murder at the Gallop (1963) – Mr. Trundell
 The Kiss of the Vampire (1963) – Father Xavier
 Woman of Straw (1964) – Assistant Solicitor
 The Amorous Adventures of Moll Flanders (1965) – Bishop
 Quatermass and the Pit (1967) – Abbey Librarian
 The Bushbaby (1969) – Rev. Barlow
 Some Will, Some Won't (1970) – Endicott
 Please Sir! (1971) – Mr. Cromwell
 Mr. Selkie (1979) – Grandpa Ross
 John Wycliffe: The Morning Star (1984) – Archbishop Sudbury

External links

References

1902 births
1984 deaths
People from Bexley
English male television actors
Male actors from Kent
20th-century English male actors